Beatriz Acevedo is an American entrepreneur. She was a former radio and TV personality with three Emmy Awards, one MTV Music Award, and a Media Correspondent Award.

Career 
Beatriz started her career in media at the age of eight, first on radio and later on television. Her work earned her three Emmys, one MTV Music Award, and a Media Correspondent Award among others. She later became a tech media entrepreneur as the Co-Founder and President of mitú, a digital media brand for young Latinos in the U.S.

She recently co-founded and co-chairs LA Collab, a Hollywood initiative aimed at doubling Latino representation in Hollywood, both in front and behind the camera by 2030.

Beatriz is also the founder and CEO of SUMA Wealth, a financial technology company devoted to increasing prosperity, opportunity, and financial inclusion for young U.S.-born Latinos. She is a regular speaker at entrepreneurial conferences and events. She is a board member of 2028 Los Angeles Olympic Committee, Beneficial State Bank, Latino Community Foundation and other professional bodies.

Philanthropy 
Beatriz is currently the President of her family's foundation, Acevedo Foundation, which focuses on creating equitable access to capital, closing the educational gap, and promoting economic mobility and inclusion for the Latino community.

Personal life 
Beatriz resides in Santa Monica, California with her husband and twin teenagers.

References

External links
 Suma Wealth Website
 Acevedo Foundation Website

Living people
American women company founders
American people of Mexican descent
Year of birth missing (living people)